The 2020–21 San Diego Toreros men's basketball team represented the University of San Diego during the 2020–21 NCAA Division I men's basketball season. The Toreros were led by third-year head coach Sam Scholl. They played their home games at Jenny Craig Pavilion in San Diego, California as members of the West Coast Conference.

Previous season
The Toreros finished the 2019–20 season 9–23, 2–14 in WCC play to finish in 9th place. They lost in the first round of the WCC tournament to Loyola Marymount.

Roster

Schedule and results
On November 20, San Diego paused all activities for 14 days following Covid-19 positive tests, cancelling scheduled games during that time.

|-
!colspan=12 style=| Non-conference regular season

|-
!colspan=12 style=| WCC regular season

|-
!colspan=12 style=| WCC tournament

Source:

References

San Diego Toreros men's basketball seasons
San Diego
San Diego Toreros
San Diego Toreros